Queen's Bridge is a B+ listed Victorian stone arch bridge in Belfast, Northern Ireland. It opened to traffic in 1843 and is named after Queen Victoria.

Long Bridge 

The previous bridge on this site was the Long Bridge, which began construction in 1682, supposedly on the site of an ancient ford. The bridge was rebuilt several times over the years, such as in 1692, when seven arches collapsed due to Williamite troops transporting their cannons over it. By 1830, traffic volumes were increasing and a wider bridge was required, so the intention to build a new bridge was announced. The Long Bridge was not demolished until work on the new bridge began in 1840, and it is shown on the 1833 Ordnance Survey map. 

A piece of granite from the Long Bridge is embedded in the pavement at the junction of Castreagh Street and Albertbridge Road in East Belfast.

Construction
The contract for the construction of the new bridge was given by the Board of Works to Francis Ritchie & Son, with a tendered price of £27,000. The bridge was designed by Thomas Jackson and John Fraser, in their respective roles as county surveyors of Antrim and Down (the river is the county boundary).  However in 1836, Jackson was replaced as Antrim county surveyor by Charles Lanyon, and so he supervised the construction with Fraser. By March 1841, preparations were being made for the foundations of the bridge, however it had not yet been decided whether the bridge would have a higher central arch to reduce the overall approach gradient, or if it would have a horizontal deck. By July 1842, one of the arches had been keyed in, with the horizontal deck design having been chosen.  The bridge opened in January 1843, to budget but slightly late. In 1849, it was named Queen's Bridge in honour of Queen Victoria's visit to Belfast, during which she officially opened the bridge.

Structure 
The arches are dressed with Newry Granite. They carry their maker's name ("Gregg, Sons & Phenix/ Iron Founders/ Belfast"), and the Belfast Corporation coat of arms on their pedestals.

See also
List of bridges over the River Lagan

References

Bridges in Northern Ireland
Buildings and structures in Belfast
Bridges completed in 1843
1843 establishments in Ireland
Grade B+ listed buildings